Death sentences during the Mahsa Amini protests is a list of Iranian citizens sentenced to death or charged with crimes punishable by death in the Islamic Republic of Iran during the Mahsa Amini protests. Following rushed trials that were widely criticized by human rights organizations, the Islamic Republic executed four protestors, Mohsen Shekari, Majidreza Rahnavard, Mohammad Mehdi Karami and Seyyed Mohammad Hosseini, and charged dozens with offenses that are punishable by death in Iran. The list does not include demonstrators who have been killed by police during the protests, and it does not include people who received death sentences for convictions unrelated to the protests.

Overview 
Thousands of protesters have been detained as a result of the Mahsa Amini protests, and dozens have been charged with offenses such as Moharebeh ("Waging War Against God") or Mofsed-e-filarz ("Corruption on Earth"), which are punishable by death under the Islamic Republic of Iran. 

Analysts have warned that the Islamic Republic is "determined to carry out mass executions," and "keeps the execution cases as vague as possible to 'confuse' domestic and international reactions until the last minute," said Hossein Bastani, a prominent political analyst for BBC Persian. He continued that "worldwide, practical reactions might still prevent a human disaster."

Many of the trials have taken place in Iran's Islamic Revolutionary Court system. The system has received international criticism for holding trials behind closed doors and often not allowing defendants to review the evidence used against them. In Tehran, most trials have been presided over by Judge Abolqasem Salavati, who faces U.S. sanctions for meting out harsh punishments. A statement by the United States Department of the Treasury criticized Salvati for handing down more than 100 death sentences and lengthy prison sentences to political prisoners, human rights activists, media workers, and "others seeking to exercise freedom of assembly."

Responses 
Iranian citizens, human rights groups, and the international community have put immense pressure on the Islamic Republic government to discontinue political executions. Human rights organizations have condemned the use of "sham trials designed to intimidate protestors" and the "chilling use of the death penalty in rush trials." United Nations human rights experts have "raised alarm over detained protesters" and condemned death sentences "following unfair trials" resulting in "arbitrary deprivation of life." According to Amnesty International, "several defendants were tortured, and their torture-tainted 'confessions' were used as evidence. State media broadcast forced 'confessions' of at least nine defendants prior to trial."

Numerous members of parliament in European countries, including those in Germany, Sweden, France, and Netherlands have taken on the political sponsorship of protesters who are currently facing the death penalty.

Following pressure from both inside and outside the country, on December 16, 2022, the Islamic Republic let 17-year-old Sonia Sharifi out on bail. She had been reportedly charged with Moharebeh ("waging war against God"), but just before her release, the prosecutor stated that she has not yet been formally charged.

The death sentences against co-accused Hamid Ghare-Hasanlou, Hossein Mohammadi, and Reza Aria were overturned on January 3, 2023, "due to the existence of defects in the proceedings," and retrial was ordered by the Supreme Court of Iran.

List of people currently facing the death penalty 
The following list contains information on many of those currently facing death sentences in Iran directly for their involvement in the 2022 Mahsa Amini protests, triggered by the death of Mahsa Amini.

See also 

 Deaths during the Mahsa Amini protests

References 

2022 in Iran
Human rights abuses in Iran
People sentenced to death